Ian Lawrence may refer to:

 Ian Lawrence (mayor) (1937–2019), Wellington lawyer and mayor of Wellington, 1983–1986
 Ian Lawrence (cricketer) (born 1963), former English cricketer
 Ian Lawrence (footballer) (born 2002), Costa Rican footballer